The 1962–63 Bradford City A.F.C. season was the 50th in the club's history.

The club finished 23rd in Division Four (being re-elected to maintain their Football League status), reached the 3rd round of the FA Cup, and the 1st round of the League Cup.

The club had to be re-elected to maintain their Football League status for the second time in their history, the first being in 1948–49.

Sources

References

Bradford City A.F.C. seasons
Bradford City